The People's Press Printing Society (PPPS) is a readers' co-operative with the purpose of owning and publishing a left-wing, British, daily newspaper. The co-operative was established in 1945, with shares sold at £1. Originally the paper was titled the Daily Worker, but the publication was re-launched as the Morning Star in 1966.

On 6 January 1946, at the Albert Hall in London, Bill Jones, the leader of the London busmen's trade union, handed over the formal document of transfer to William Rust (editor of the Daily Worker). Ownership of the Daily Worker was transferred from the Communist Party of Great Britain (CPGB) to the PPPS, with CPGB retaining editorial and political control of the paper until in 1951, the Daily Worker Co-operative Society was established to act as the nominal publishers of the paper.

The Daily Worker Co-operative Society became the Morning Star Co-operative Society which later became bankrupt and the sole ownership for the publication of the Morning Star fell under the People's Press Printing Society. The People’s Press Printing Society has a difficult financial existence, making a £41,179 loss in 2013 and a £1,137 surplus in 2014.

Publications other than the Morning Star
 32 Questions on the freedom of the press. 
 Science in the atomic age ..., 1947 
 William Rust, The people rule in Yugoslavia 
 Eudoras Joannides, Inside free Greece : exclusive reports of the Greek situation from Evdos Joannides /
 Alan Winnington, I saw the truth in Korea ... facts and photographs that will shock Britain!, 1950 /
 E. P. Thompson, The struggle for a free press, 1952 
 Derek Kartun, USA '53; the truth behind Eisenhower, 1953 /

References

External links 
 People's Press Printing Society records at National Library of Wales

1945 establishments in the United Kingdom
Co-operatives in the United Kingdom
Media cooperatives
Organizations established in 1945
Publishing companies of the United Kingdom
Consumers' co-operatives of the United Kingdom